The Agency is an American action-spy television series that followed the inner-workings of the CIA. The series was aired on CBS from September 27, 2001 until May 17, 2003, lasting two seasons.

The series was created by Michael Frost Beckner and was executive produced by Beckner, Shaun Cassidy Productions, and Radiant Productions in association with Universal Network Television and CBS Productions.  The program featured unprecedented filming from the actual CIA headquarters.

Premise
The series was controversial in its exploration of contemporary international affairs and its treatment of the ethical conflicts inherent in intelligence work. Beckner's pilot script, written in March 2001, posited a re-invented CIA tasked with a "War on Terror" after Osama Bin Laden's Al Qaeda terrorist organization plots a lethal attack on the West. The pilot was to premiere at CIA headquarters on September 18, 2001, and set to air on CBS September 21, 2001; however, the actual 9/11 attacks convinced the network to hold the pilot and instead air a later episode.  That first episode was broadcast later as the fifth episode of the first season.

The September 11, 2001 terrorist attacks changed the way Americans viewed topical entertainment and The Agency, at the time, was one of the most topical offerings on network television. The producers of the series quickly responded to this new American perspective on world affairs, but CBS canceled the show shortly after the second season's final episode.

Cast
 Gil Bellows – Matt Callan (season 1)
 Daniel Benzali – Deputy Director Robert Quinn (episodes 14–44; recurring previously)
 Beau Bridges – Senator/Director Tom Gage (episodes 14–44)
 Rocky Carroll – Carl Reese
 David Clennon – Joshua Nankin
 Ronny Cox – Director Alex Pierce (episodes 1–10)
 Jason O'Mara – A.B. Stiles (season 2)
 Will Patton – Jackson Haisley
 Gloria Reuben – Lisa Fabrizzi (episodes 1–13, 21–22)
 Richard Speight, Jr. – Lex (season 2; recurring previously)
 Paige Turco – Terri Lowell

Episodes

Home media

References

External links

2000s American drama television series
2001 American television series debuts
2003 American television series endings
American action television series
American spy drama television series
Espionage television series
Television series about the Central Intelligence Agency
CBS original programming
Television series by Universal Television
Television series by CBS Studios
Television shows set in Fairfax County, Virginia
Television shows set in Virginia